Sierra County is a county located in the U.S. state of California. As of the 2020 census, the population was 3,236, making it California's second-least populous county. The county seat is Downieville; the sole incorporated city is Loyalton. The county is in the Sierra Nevada, northeast of Sacramento on the border with Nevada.

History
Sierra County was formed from parts of Yuba County in 1852. The county derives its name from the Sierra Nevada.

Prior to the California Gold Rush, the area was home to both the Maidu and the Washoe peoples. They generally summered in the higher elevations to hunt and fish, and returned to lower elevations for the winter months. After the discovery of gold in the Sierra foothills sparked the California Gold Rush, more than 16,000 miners settled in Sierra County between 1848 and 1860. Most mining settlements in the county sprung up along the North and Middle Forks of the Yuba River, both of which had rich deposits of gold. While some of the mining boom towns faded away once gold fever died down, other settlements such as Downieville and Sierra City have remained.

Notable gold nuggets found in the county include a 26.5 pound specimen, avoirdupois, found by a group of sailors at Sailor Ravine, two miles above Downieville. A 51-pound specimen was found in 1853 by a group of Frenchmen in French Ravine. The 106 pound Monumental Nugget was found in Sept. 1869 at Sierra City.

The Bald Mountain drift mine in Forest City was founded in Aug. 1864, and was the largest of its kind in the state at the time. The Bald Mountain Extension was located in 1874 east of Forest. The Monte Cristo Mine was located in 1854. The largest quartz-mine is the Sierra Buttes Gold Mine was located in 1850 near Sierra City. The Gold Bluff Mine was located near Downieville in 1854. By 1880 the county was "crushing" 70,000 tons of quartz and had 266 miles of mining ditches.

Geography
Sierra County, California is a vast and beautiful area that covers 962 square miles according to the U.S. Census Bureau. The county comprises of 953 square miles of land and 9 square miles of water. The county is located in the Sierra Nevada, known for its rugged mountain ranges and picturesque landscapes. The county is known for its natural beauty and rich history, providing a diverse range of landscapes, from rugged mountains to lush forests, tranquil lakes, and streams, and much more. The area is a great place for outdoor enthusiasts, with opportunities for hiking, fishing, hunting, and exploring the natural wonders of the Sierra Nevada.

Adjacent counties
 Nevada County, California - south
 Yuba County, California - west
 Plumas County, California - north
 Lassen County, California - northeast
 Washoe County, Nevada - east

National protected areas
 Plumas National Forest (part)
 Tahoe National Forest (part)
 Toiyabe National Forest (part)

Politics and government 
Because Loyalton is Sierra County's most populous municipality and its only incorporated city, generally half of the meetings of the county's board of supervisors are held in Downieville and the other half are held in Loyalton.  The county is governed by the five-member Sierra County Board of Supervisors, consisting of the following members as of August 2021.
 District One (Downieville, Goodyears' Bar, Pike, Alleghany): Lee Adams, Chairman
 District Two (Sierra City, Bassetts, Verdi): Peter W. Huebner
 District Three (Calpine, Sattley, Sierraville): Paul Roen
 District Four (Loyalton): Terry LeBlanc
 District Five (Sierra Brooks): Sharon Dryden

Law enforcement is provided by the Sierra County Sheriff's Department, headed by current Sierra County Sheriff-Coroner Michael "Mike" Fisher.  Due to the county's sparse population and geographical obstacles, the Sheriff's Department operates a substation in Loyalton in addition to their main headquarters in Downieville.

Voter registration statistics

Cities by population and voter registration

Overview 
Sierra County at one time had favored the Democratic party in presidential elections and was one of few counties in California to be won by George McGovern. In more recent times it is a strongly Republican county in presidential and congressional elections. The last Democrat to win a majority in the county was Jimmy Carter in 1976.

  
  
  
  
  
  
  
  
  
  
  
  
  
  
  
  
  
  
  
  
  
  
  
  
  
  
  
  
  
  
  

On November 4, 2008, Sierra County voted 64.2% for Proposition 8, which amended the California Constitution to ban same-sex marriages.

In the 2009 special statewide election, Sierra County had the highest voter turnout of any county in California, with 53.6% of registered voters participating, according to the Los Angeles Times. The election was nearly double the overall voter turnout in the state, about 23%.

Transportation
There is only one traffic signal (a flashing red light at the intersection of highways 49 and 89) in Sierra County. In the winter of 2007 it was removed after an automobile accident and was replaced in the fall of 2008.

Major highways
 U.S. Route 395
 Interstate 80
 State Route 49
 State Route 89

County roads
 County Route A23
 County Route A24
Henness Pass Road
Stampede Dam Road
Gold Lake Road/Highway

Public transportation
Public transportation in Sierra County is limited to vans run by senior citizen agencies in Downieville and Loyalton which the general public may ride on a space-available basis.

Airport
Sierraville-Dearwater Field Airport is a general aviation airport located near Sierraville.

Crime 

The following table includes the number of incidents reported and the rate per 1,000 persons for each type of offense.

Demographics

2020 census

Note: the US Census treats Hispanic/Latino as an ethnic category. This table excludes Latinos from the racial categories and assigns them to a separate category. Hispanics/Latinos can be of any race.

2015
As of 2015 the largest self-reported ancestry groups in Sierra County, California are:

2011

Places by population, race, and income

2010
The 2010 United States Census reported that Sierra County had a population of 3,240. The racial makeup of Sierra County was 3,022 (93.3%) White, 6 (0.2%) African American, 44 (1.4%) Native American, 12 (0.4%) Asian, 2 (0.1%) Pacific Islander, 75 (2.3%) from other races, and 79 (2.4%) from two or more races. Hispanic or Latino of any race were 269 persons (8.3%).

2000
As of the census of 2000, there were 3,555 people, 1,520 households and 986 families residing in the county. The population density was 4 people per square mile (1/km2). There were 2,202 housing units at an average density of 2 per square mile (1/km2). The racial makeup of the county was 94.2% White, 0.2% Black or African American, 1.9% Native American, 0.2% Asian, 0.1% Pacific Islander, 1.0% from other races, and 2.5% from two or more races. Six percent of the population were Hispanic or Latino of any race.

Eighteen percent were of English ancestry, 16% were of Irish, 11% German and 8% Italian ancestry. Over ninety-five (95.3) percent spoke English and 3.4% Spanish as their first language.

There were 1,520 households, out of which 27.6% had children under the age of 18 living with them, 53.1% were married couples living together, 7.9% had a female householder with no husband present, and 35.1% were non-families. 29.0% of all households were made up of individuals, and 11.5% had someone living alone who was 65 years of age or older. The average household size was 2.32 and the average family size was 2.83.

In the county, the population was spread out, with 23.3% under the age of 18, 4.8% from 18 to 24, 24.0% from 25 to 44, 30.2% from 45 to 64, and 17.7% who were 65 years of age or older. The median age was 44 years. For every 100 females there were 102.0 males. For every 100 females age 18 and over, there were 97.9 males.

The median income for a household in the county was $35,827, and the median income for a family was $42,756. Males had a median income of $36,121 versus $30,000 for females. The per capita income for the county was $18,815. About 9.0% of families and 11.3% of the population were below the poverty line, including 14.3% of those under age 18 and 2.2% of those age 65 or over.

Media 
Sierra County is served by two long-running local newspapers.  The Sierra Valley region, which is partially within Sierra County, is served by the Sierra Booster, based in Loyalton.  This paper has been published bi-weekly since 1949 when it was established by reporter, miner, and airman Hal Wright and his wife Allene.  It is today run by their daughter Janice Wright Buck.

The other paper serving the county is The Mountain Messenger which is based in Downieville.  The Messenger has been in constant publication since 1853 and is currently the longest-running weekly newspaper in the state of California. Its more notable former contributor was Mark Twain, at the time in hiding from Nevadan authorities and writing under his birth name of Samuel Clemens.

This paper was the center of considerable media attention in early 2020 when its future was uncertain with the retirement of Don Russell, who had owned and operated it for 30 years; it was saved by local retiree Carl Butz, who purchased the paper and runs it today. The Mountain Messenger is printed every Thursday by Feather Publishing Co., based in Quincy; it is distributed across Sierra, eastern Plumas and western Nevada counties.

Education
Sierra-Plumas Joint Unified School District

Communities

City
Loyalton

Census-designated places

Alleghany
Calpine
Downieville (county seat)
Goodyears Bar
Pike
Sattley
Sierra Brooks
Sierra City
Sierraville
Verdi

Unincorporated communities
Forest
Gibsonville
Bassetts

Ghost towns

 Eureka City
 Howland Flat
 Pine Grove
 Poker Flat
 Potosi
 Shady Flat

Population ranking

The population ranking of the following table is based on the 2010 census of Sierra County.

† county seat

See also 
Hiking trails in Sierra County
National Register of Historic Places listings in Sierra County, California
Schroeder Mountain

Notes

References

External links

Sierra County Chamber of Commerce
Sierra County Visitor Guide
Sierra County Office of Education
Discover Sierra County

 
1852 establishments in California
California counties
Populated places established in 1852